The Aurora Transportation Center is a station on Metra's BNSF Line in Aurora, Illinois. In Metra's zone-based fare system, Aurora is in zone H. As of 2018, Aurora is the 13th busiest of Metra's 236 non-downtown stations, with an average of 1,856 weekday boardings. There is a staffed station building. Just north of the station is the Hill Yard, a large coach yard used to store the Metra trains on the BNSF Line. Aurora is a stub-track terminal, which means the Metra tracks end here. Amtrak and BNSF freights use the two tracks east of the station. 

Aurora is the west end of the BNSF Railway Line and is served by numerous Pace bus routes. It served as a Greyhound bus stop until September 7, 2011.

History
The station replaced the former Aurora Depot, at the corners of South Broadway and Washington Street. The station was constructed in 1922 by the Chicago, Burlington and Quincy Railroad and closed in 1986. It was also served by Amtrak and Metra trains until the opening of the Aurora Transportation Center. The building was torn down in April 2013. Amtrak service shifted to Naperville station, and continue to stop presently.

Bus connections
Pace
 524 West Aurora
 530 West Galena/Naperville
 533 Northeast Aurora
 802 Aurora/Geneva via Lake

References

External links 
 

Metra stations in Illinois
Buildings and structures in Aurora, Illinois
Transportation in Aurora, Illinois
Railway stations in the United States opened in 1986
Bus stations in Illinois